The Music Hall was a historic theatre located at 23 West Main Street in Clinton, Hunterdon County, New Jersey. It was added to the National Register of Historic Places on May 7, 1982 for its significance in commerce, education, music, theatre and film.

History
The Music Hall was built in 1890 and presented performances of many forms of American popular entertainment.

On May 15, 2016, a fire destroyed the interior of the building, then known as Clinton Center. It was demolished later that year.

References

External links
 

Buildings and structures in Clinton, New Jersey	
National Register of Historic Places in Hunterdon County, New Jersey
New Jersey Register of Historic Places
1890 establishments in New Jersey
Theatres on the National Register of Historic Places in New Jersey
Historic district contributing properties in New Jersey
2016 disestablishments in New Jersey